The African Women's Development Fund (AWDF) is the first pan-African foundation to support the work of women's rights organisations in Africa. AWDF was founded in 2001 by Bisi Adeleye-Fayemi, Joana Foster and Hilda M. Tardia. AWDF belongs to the International Network of Women’s Funds, an umbrella organisation for feminist foundations that focus on supporting women's human rights.

Achievements
Ellen Johnson Sirleaf, President of Liberia and 2011 Nobel Peace Prize winner, delivered AWDF's tenth anniversary lecture at the celebrations in Accra, Ghana, in November 2010. On the occasion, Sirleaf said: "Heartfelt congratulations to you, AWDF Sisters, on reaching your tenth year! You have succeeded in your goals; you have weathered the global economic crisis; you have demonstrated resilience and determination to succeed in your noble cause to promote leadership and empowerment for African women."

Between 2001 and 2016 the AWDF distributed US$26 million to women's rights organizations.

AWDF signed a working document to guide its analysis and practices during The African Feminists Forum that took place in Accra from 15 to 19 November 2016.

References

External links
 Official website

Women's organisations based in Ghana
Non-profit organizations based in Africa
Feminist organizations in Africa
Organizations established in 2001
2001 establishments in Ghana